"Beautiful People" is a song by English synth-pop duo Pet Shop Boys, released on 2 October 2009 as the third and final single from their tenth studio album, Yes (2009). Initially, the single was released in Germany only, at the request of EMI. In November, it was released digitally in the United States.

The B-side, "Fugitive", had previously been published (in an extended version) on the limited edition of their 2006 album Fundamental. The song was produced by Richard X.

Both the demo version of "Beautiful People" and the remix of "Up and Down" had been previously available digitally. The demo was available to stream from the official Pet Shop Boys website and the remix was available as a free download during the "Did You See Me Coming?" single campaign. Remixes by Vinny Vero were commissioned but not used due to delays in their completion. They were later released unofficially as a free download on Vero's website.

Track listing
German CD maxi single
"Beautiful People" – 3:44
"Fugitive" (seven-inch mix) – 3:31
"Beautiful People" (demo) – 3:22
"Up and Down" (Tom Stephan remix) – 7:57

Charts

References

2000s ballads
2009 singles
2009 songs
Parlophone singles
Pet Shop Boys songs
Pop ballads
Song recordings produced by Xenomania
Songs written by Chris Lowe
Songs written by Neil Tennant